The Buru honeyeater (Lichmera deningeri) is a species of bird in the honeyeater family. It is endemic to Indonesia. Its natural habitats are subtropical or tropical moist lowland forests and subtropical or tropical moist montane forests.

References

Buru honeyeater
Birds of Buru
Buru honeyeater
Taxonomy articles created by Polbot